Dichomeris atricornis is a moth in the family Gelechiidae. It was described by Edward Meyrick in 1934. It is found in Sierra Leone.

References

Moths described in 1934
atricornis